The first season of King of the Nerds aired on TBS from January 13, 2013 to March 7, 2013. Inspired by the Revenge of the Nerds films, the season was hosted by actors and executive producers Robert Carradine and Curtis Armstrong, known for their roles as Lewis Skolnick and Dudley "Booger" Dawson, respectively, in Revenge of the Nerds.

Contestants

Contestant progress

: Alana received individual immunity from being sent to the Nerd-Off.
: Teams were dissolved and Nerd Wars became individual challenges.
: The final Nerd War was separated into two phases; in each phase, the loser was automatically eliminated.
Key
 (WINNER) The contestant won the competition and was crowned "King of the Nerds".
 (RUNNER-UP) The contestant was the runner-up in the competition.
 (WIN) The contestant won the Nerd War and received immunity from elimination.
 (IN) The contestant lost the Nerd War, but was not selected to compete in the Nerd-Off.
 (RISK) The contestant won the Nerd-Off and escaped elimination.
 (OUT) The contestant lost the Nerd-Off and was eliminated from the competition.
Teams
 The contestant was a member of Team Blextrophy.
 The contestant was a member of Team Servants of the Forsaken Orb.

Episodes

References

External links
 
 

2013 American television seasons
Nerd culture
Works about computer hacking